Telok Mas is a small town in Melaka Tengah District, Malacca, Malaysia.

Economy
 Telok Mas Industrial Estate

Schools
Henry Gurney Prisoners School
SK Telok Mas
SMK Telok Mas
SMK(A) Sharifah Rodziah
SJK(C) Kuang Yah  光亚华小
SRA Telok Mas

See also
 List of cities and towns in Malaysia by population

References

Central Melaka District
Towns in Malacca